Guaraci Francisco de Oliveira Filho (Sorocaba, March 2, 1992), known as just Guaraci, is a Brazilian soccer player. He is a defensive midfielder and currently plays in Coritiba.

Career

Youth Teams

Atlético-PR 
In 2008, Guaraci  plays in U-17 in Atlético-PR.

Rio Branco-SP 
In 2010, he was hired for the youth team (U-20) by Rio Branco of São Paulo. But, then, he was hired by Corinthians.

Corinthians 
Like Rio Branco-SP, he is in Corinthians for much short, in same year he was hired by Coritiba.

Coritiba 
In Coritiba, he finished the year of 2010 like a Youth Team player of Coritiba.

Professional

Coritiba 
His professional debut was in 2011 for Coritiba. He stayed for some matches as a reserve. But, then, he was loaned to Toledo.

Toledo 
Guaraci spent 2012 playing for Toledo. The loan finished at the end of December 2012, and he returned to Coritiba in 2013.

References

External links 
Zero Zero PT
UOL Esporte

1992 births
Living people
Brazilian footballers
Austin Aztex players
Brazilian expatriate sportspeople in the United States
Association football midfielders
Expatriate soccer players in the United States
USL Championship players
Brazilian expatriate footballers
Clube Recreativo e Atlético Catalano players
Rio Branco Esporte Clube players
People from Sorocaba
Coritiba Foot Ball Club players
Toledo Esporte Clube players
Madureira Esporte Clube players
Duque de Caxias Futebol Clube players
Guaratinguetá Futebol players
Footballers from São Paulo (state)